Nangong Kuo (南宮适), sometimes misread as Nangong Shi, may refer to:

 Nangong Kuo (Western Zhou), official of Western Zhou
 Nangong Kuo (disciple of Confucius)